Pine Township is a township in Indiana County, Pennsylvania, United States. The population was 1,881 at the 2020 census. The township includes the communities of Alverda, Heilwood, Mentcle (previously Penn Mary), Nolo, Pineton, and Strongstown.

History 

Pine Township was settled circa 1823, and incorporated out of Wheatfield Township during the 1850s. In 1827, St. Patrick's Church was built in Pine Township, becoming the oldest Catholic Church in Indiana County.

Geography
According to the United States Census Bureau, the township has a total area of 31.0 square miles (80.4 km), all  land.

Demographics

As of the census of 2000, there were 2,140 people, 815 households, and 621 families residing in the township.  The population density was 69.0 people per square mile (26.6/km).  There were 894 housing units at an average density of 28.8/sq mi (11.1/km).  The racial makeup of the township was 99.16% White, 0.09% African American, 0.09% Native American, and 0.65% from two or more races. Hispanic or Latino of any race were 0.23% of the population.

There were 815 households, out of which 33.6% had children under the age of 18 living with them, 61.7% were married couples living together, 9.8% had a female householder with no husband present, and 23.8% were non-families. 21.0% of all households were made up of individuals, and 11.3% had someone living alone who was 65 years of age or older.  The average household size was 2.63 and the average family size was 3.05.

In the township the population was spread out, with 24.9% under the age of 18, 8.9% from 18 to 24, 28.5% from 25 to 44, 23.5% from 45 to 64, and 14.3% who were 65 years of age or older.  The median age was 38 years. For every 100 females, there were 97.1 males.  For every 100 females age 18 and over, there were 93.7 males.

The median income for a household in the township was $29,898, and the median income for a family was $33,781. Males had a median income of $29,708 versus $20,481 for females. The per capita income for the township was $12,404.  About 11.7% of families and 17.7% of the population were below the poverty line, including 24.2% of those under age 18 and 10.8% of those age 65 or over.

Communities

Census-designated places
Census-designated places are geographical areas designated by the U.S. Census Bureau for the purposes of compiling demographic data. They are not actual jurisdictions under Pennsylvania law. Other unincorporated communities, such as villages, may be listed here as well.

 Heilwood

Unincorporated communities

 Alverda
 Grismore (partly in Green Township)
 Jewtown
 Mentcle
 Nolo
 Pineton
 Rinker Crossing
 Strongstown

Government 

Township Supervisors.

Ryan Shultz, Chairman of the Board, Road Master
Keith Muir, Supervisor, Democrat
Chris Cameron, Vice Chairman
Jennifer Lindahl, Secretary/Treasurer
David Serene, Township Solicitor
William Cochran, Emergency Management

References

Townships in Indiana County, Pennsylvania
Townships in Pennsylvania